Saint Luke's Hospital, Angal, commonly known as Angal Hospital , is a private, community hospital in Angal Village, Nebbi District, West Nile sub-region, Northern Uganda.

Location
The hospital is located in Angal Village, Pamora Parish, Nyaravur sub-county, Padyere County, Nebbi District, West Nile sub-region, Northern Uganda. The geographical coordinates of Angal Hospital are: 02°24'33.0"N, 31°11'36.0"E (Latitude:2.409167; Longitude:31.193333).

Overview
Angal Hospital is a private, non-profit, community hospital owned by the Roman Catholic Diocese of Nebbi. It is accredited to the Uganda Catholic Medical Bureau, and it is administered by the Comboni Missionaries, a religious congregation. The hospital serves patients from within Nebbi District and from the neighboring districts of Arua and Zombo. Some of the patients come from the neighboring countries of South Sudan and the Democratic Republic of the Congo. The hospital has a bed  capacity of 260. It employs 153 full-time medical and support staff, as of January 2009.

History
St. Luke's Hospital, Angal was founded in the early 1940s by the Comboni Missionaries, as a maternity center. In the early 1950s, the center was upgraded to a dispensary. In 1959, the facility was granted full hospital privileges. It attained the status of a rural hospital on 13 May 1959.

Hospital operations
The hospital depends on donations and subsidies from the Ugandan government in order to meet its financial obligations. A small fee is charged for patient services, but no one is turned away because of inability to pay. During the financial year 2007/2008, the hospital's total expenses were USh  (Approx. US$524,914). Only 8.1% of the total was recovered from patient user fees. The hospital expenses that same year broke down as follows:

See also
 List of hospitals in Uganda
 Nebbi District

References

External links
  Angal Hospital Official Website

Hospitals in Uganda
Nebbi District
West Nile sub-region
Northern Region, Uganda
Hospitals established in 1940
1940 establishments in Uganda
Catholic hospitals in Africa